In precision mechanics, fit refers to the degree of 'looseness' with which a shaft is inserted into a bored hole.

This coupling is related to the tolerance or allowance of both parts' dimensions. The shaft and the orifice must be of a similar diameter, otherwise there will not be a correct adjustment. With this in mind, measurements have been internationally standardised according to ISO regulation to ensure the interchangeability of items and their mass production.

Tolerance values are designated with a capital letter in the case of orifices and lower case letters in the case of shafts. The lower the value the higher the machining costs, as a greater precision is required.

Maximum and minimum clearance 
The maximum clearance of a fit is the difference between the upper bound of the orifice diameter and the lower bound of the shaft diameter.
 maximum clearance = maximum orifice diameter – minimum shaft diameter

The minimum clearance meanwhile is the difference between the lower bound of the orifice diameter and the upper bound of the shaft diameter.
 minimum clearance = minimum orifice diameter – maximum shaft diameter

The maximum clearance in a loose or sliding fit is always greater than zero; on the other hand, in a tight fit both the maximum and minimum clearance are negative.

See also 
 Engineering fit
 Interference fit

Bibliography 
 
 
 
 
 

__notoc__
Mechanics